Ranipur Rajputan  is a village in Phagwara Tehsil in Kapurthala district of Punjab State, India. The village is administrated by a Sarpanch who is an elected representative of village as per the constitution of India and Panchayati raj (India).

Transport 
Phagwara Junction Railway Station and Chiheru Railway Station are the nearby railway stations to Ranipur Rajputan, while Jalandhar City Railway station is 16 km from the village. The village is 110 km away from Sri Guru Ram Dass Jee International Airport in Amritsar; the another nearest airport is Sahnewal Airport in Ludhiana, 50 km from the village.

References

External links
  Villages in Kapurthala
 Kapurthala Villages List

Villages in Kapurthala district